James Alexander House (also known as the Alexander-Long House) is a historic house located near Spottswood, Augusta County, Virginia.

Description and history 
It was built in 1827, and is a two-story, four bay, double-pile, hall-and-parlor plan, banked brick dwelling with a gable roof. It features four exterior end chimneys and a four-bay neocolonial porch added around the turn of the 20th century. The interior features Federal style woodwork. Also on the property are a contributing two-level limestone spring house, frame barn, smokehouse, and livestock houses.

It was listed on the National Register of Historic Places on September 16, 1982.

References

Houses on the National Register of Historic Places in Virginia
Federal architecture in Virginia
Houses completed in 1827
Houses in Augusta County, Virginia
National Register of Historic Places in Augusta County, Virginia
1827 establishments in Virginia